Tremors is a 1990 American monster comedy horror film directed by Ron Underwood, produced by Brent Maddock and S. S. Wilson, written by Maddock, Wilson, and Underwood and starring Kevin Bacon, Fred Ward, Finn Carter, Michael Gross, and Reba McEntire.

In the film, handymen Val McKee (Bacon) and Earl Bassett (Ward) wish to leave the small desert town of Perfection, Nevada, as they are tired of their dull lives. However, they happen upon a series of mysterious deaths and a concerned seismologist Rhonda (Carter) studying unnatural readings below the ground. With the help of eccentric survivalist couple Burt and Heather Gummer (Gross and McEntire), the group fights for survival against giant, prehistoric, worm-like monsters hungry for human flesh.

Released by Universal Pictures, the film is the first installment of the Tremors franchise and was followed by five direct-to-video sequels and one prequel: Tremors 2: Aftershocks (1996), Tremors 3: Back to Perfection (2001), Tremors 4: The Legend Begins (2004), Tremors 5: Bloodlines (2015), Tremors: A Cold Day in Hell (2018), and Tremors: Shrieker Island (2020). A television series titled Tremors: The Series aired from March through August 2003. A second television series was set to air in 2018 after a pilot had been shot with Bacon reprising his role for the first time since the original film, but multiple networks including Syfy passed on the series.

Plot

Valentine "Val" McKee and Earl Bassett are handymen working in Perfection, Nevada, an isolated settlement in the high desert east of the Sierra Nevada mountains. They eventually get tired of their jobs and leave for Bixby, the nearest town. As they leave, they discover the dead body of another resident, Edgar Deems, perched atop an electrical tower, still grasping the tower's crossbeams and his rifle. Jim Wallace, the town's doctor, determines that Edgar died of dehydration, apparently having been too afraid to climb down.

Later on, an unseen creature kills shepherd Fred and his flock of sheep. Val and Earl discover his severed head and believe that a serial killer is on the loose. Two construction workers ignore Val and Earl's warning and are killed by the same creature, causing a rock slide. Val and Earl try to find help after warning the residents, but find the phone lines are dead and that the rock slide has blocked the only road out of town. Out of sight, a snake-like creature wraps itself around their truck's rear axle, but is torn apart when Val stomps on the accelerator and drives away, and is discovered when they return to town.

Val and Earl borrow horses to ride to Bixby for help. They come upon Wallace and his wife's buried station wagon near their trailer, but the couple is missing (having been killed the previous night). As they press on, an enormous burrowing worm-like monster suddenly erupts out of the ground, revealing the snake-like creature to be one of the worm's many tentacled "tongues". Thrown from their horses, the men flee with the monster in pursuit. The chase ends when the eyeless creature crashes through the concrete wall of an aqueduct, dying from the impact. Rhonda LeBeck, a graduate student conducting seismology tests in the area, stumbles onto the scene; she deduces from previous readings that three other worms are in the area. Rhonda, Val, and Earl become trapped overnight atop a cluster of boulders near one of the worms, and surmise that the creatures hunt their prey by detecting seismic vibrations. The trio then find some discarded poles and use them to pole vault over to nearby boulders, eventually reaching Rhonda's truck and escaping.

After the three return to town, the worms attack and kill general store owner Walter Chang, forcing everyone to hide on the town's various rooftops. Meanwhile, survivalist couple Burt and Heather Gummer manage to kill one of the creatures after unwittingly luring it to their basement armory. In town, the two remaining worms attack the building foundations, knocking over a trailer belonging to Nestor before dragging him under and devouring him. Realizing they cannot stay in the town any longer, Earl, Rhonda, and Miguel distract the monsters while Val commandeers a track loader and chains a semi-trailer to the rear; the survivors use it to try to escape to a nearby mountain range. En route, both worms create a sinkhole trap that disables the track loader, and the survivors flee to some nearby boulders for safety. Earl then has an idea to lure in the worms and trick them into swallowing Burt's homemade pipe bombs. The strategy successfully kills one worm, but the last one spits a bomb back towards the survivors, forcing them to disperse as the explosion destroys all but one of the remaining bombs.

Val lures the final worm into chasing him to the edge of a cliff and then explodes the remaining bomb behind it, frightening the worm into charging through the cliff face, where it plummets to its death onto the rocks below. The group returns to town, where they call in the authorities to begin an investigation while Earl encourages Val to pursue a romantic relationship with Rhonda.

Cast

Production
The concept of Tremors was originally conceived in the early 1980s, when writers S. S. Wilson and Brent Maddock were working for the United States Navy as filmmakers in charge of creating educational safety videos. While getting footage, the two climbed a large desert boulder and asked the question "What if there was something that wouldn't let us off of this rock?" This inspired the two to start brainstorming ideas for a monster movie, which was eventually dubbed "Land Sharks". They shared their idea to their friend Ron Underwood, who was working with National Geographic as a documentary director, and used his knowledge of zoology to better develop the "land sharks" into creatures that could realistically exist.

After their script for Short Circuit spawned a major box office hit, Wilson and Maddock quickly began shopping around their idea for Tremors. The name "Land Sharks" was changed owing to a then-popular Saturday Night Live sketch featuring a character of the same name. The original screenplay, titled 'Beneath Perfection', was finished in June 1988.

Filming
Filming began in early 1989 and lasted over 50 days. Principal photography took place around Lone Pine, California, and the isolated community of Darwin, California, which the crew liked because of its similitaries to the fictional town of Perfection, Nevada. The town, which was entirely a set, was built near Olancha, California. The mountains in the distance are the Sierra Nevada, and Owens Lake is visible in the background during the film's climax.

Props
The creature for Tremors was designed by Amalgamated Dynamics. The full-scale graboid seen after being dug up by Val was cast in lightweight foam. It was placed in a trench and buried and dug up again to achieve the desired "used" effect.

Burt's elephant gun, an 8-gauge Darne shotgun, was rented from a private collector for use in the film. It "fired" dummy cartridges custom made from solid brass rod stock.

Post-production
Composer Ernest Troost's musical score for the film went mostly unused. The studio thought it was "too goofy" and cut most of it, later hiring composer Robert Folk to write a new score that was more "serious and action-y". Despite his contributions, Folk ultimately went uncredited.

Tremors was set for a November 1989 release. However, the MPAA gave the film an R rating owing to language, and the creators decided at the last minute to make the film more commercially available. Over 20 or so uses of the word "fuck" were either cut or redubbed with softer words; examples include "Can you fly, you sucker?" and "We killed that motherhumper", among several others. The film was pushed back to allow more time for editing, and the film was eventually released in January 1990 with a PG-13 rating. Wilson and Maddock later stated they were very happy with the decision to make Tremors appeal to a more family-friendly audience rather than an adult-oriented audience.

Release and reception

Box office
Tremors opened on January 19, 1990, in 1,457 theaters against no new releases and debuted at the #5 spot, behind Born on the Fourth of July, Tango & Cash, The War of the Roses, and Internal Affairs, grossing $3,731,520 in its opening weekend. It dropped to #6 on its second week but would stay in the top 10 for four weeks before finally dropping to #11 in week 5. Tremors had a budget of $10 million and ended up grossing $16,667,084 at the domestic box office, which made it financially successful, though far below projected numbers. In 2019, Kevin Bacon hinted that Tremors only made "a fifth of what the charts at Universal said it would." Its creators blamed the subpar theatrical performance on its marketing campaign; S. S. Wilson felt that the film was not well promoted once its release date was delayed, while Brent Maddock stated the theatrical trailer was "cringeworthy" and likely deterred audiences.

Critical reception
Tremors was hailed by critics for its diverse cast and humor. As of August 2022, the film holds a "certified fresh" rating of 88% at the review aggregator website Rotten Tomatoes, based on 50 reviews and an average score of 7.2 out of 10, with the consensus: "An affectionate throwback to 1950s creature features, Tremors reinvigorates its genre tropes with a finely balanced combination of horror and humor.

James Berardinelli praised Tremors with a 3/4 star rating, feeling that "horror/comedies often tread too far to one side or the other of that fine line; Tremors walks it like a tightrope". Roger Ebert gave the film 3.5/4 stars, admitting he was "embarrassed" he enjoyed it so much, saying "[Tremors] succeeds in the fact that it puts its focus on fun characters instead of the creatures attacking them" and called it "a goofy, dumb, fun movie". Ty Burr of Entertainment Weekly gave Tremors a B+, saying: "Tremors is the Slacker of monster movies: bemused, improvisatory, willfully low-key". Richard Harrington of The Washington Post called the film "a delightful throwback" that "evokes the populist spirit of '50s B-movies". Jeffery Anderson of the San Francisco Examiner gave the film a glowing 4.5/5 star review, calling Tremors "effectively terrifying when it needs to be, effectively exciting when it needs to be, and effectively hilarious when it needs to be... Tremors may very well be the best horror film, the best action flick, and the best comedy of the year".

In some less enthusiastic reviews, Vincent Canby for The New York Times remarked that the film "was clearly more fun to make than it is for us to watch", and Variety gave the film a C− on the basis that Tremors "...has a few clever twists and characters but ultimately can't decide on what it wants to be: flat-out funny, which it's usually not, or a scarefest, which it's usually not either." Gene Siskel initially gave the film a negative review, stating: "A little of it goes an awfully long way... There are just so many tricks, though, that you can do with the worms. Tremors would make a cute short subject, it doesn't sustain itself for an entire film". However, in a rare change of heart of Siskel, he later reevaluated the film two years later, saying, "This picture has grown on me... I think it is worth a second viewing. There is a spirit of good fun there" and "Tremors is one of the B-movies to get the formula right. I highly recommend it".

Home releases
While only a modest hit at the box office, Tremors went on to become a massive hit on home video purchases, rentals, and television, becoming one of the most rented films of 1990. Because of this, it has gained a very large cult following over the years.

Tremors debuted on VHS on April 1, 1990, on Laserdisc on April 16, 1996, and on DVD on April 28, 1998. It was released on VHS by Universal Pictures Home Entertainment on June 2, 2000. The film was released on Blu-ray on November 9, 2010, and again on September 17, 2013, as part of the Tremors: Attack Pack for region 1 (U.S. and Canada). In the United Kingdom, the Attack Pack was not released on Blu-ray; instead, the second, third, and fourth films were released on Blu-ray separately on August 5, 2013. It was released on 4K UHD Blu-ray and Blu-ray by Arrow Video on December 15, 2020, based on a 4K restoration.

Soundtrack

The soundtrack for Tremors was composed by Ernest Troost and released in 2000. The album contained nine tracks from the film as well as four additional tracks, also composed by Troost, from Bloodrush. For promotional purposes, the album was released as a limited edition CD. In 2020, La-La Land Records gave the score its first commercial release as a 2-CD set; CD 1 featured Troost's music, with CD 2 containing Robert Folk's additional music.

Sequels and spin-offs

A sequel, Tremors 2: Aftershocks, was released in 1996. A second sequel, Tremors 3: Back to Perfection, was released in 2001, followed by a prequel, Tremors 4: The Legend Begins in 2004. These three sequels were all made with direct involvement from S. S. Wilson, Brent Maddock, and Ron Underwood at Stampede Entertainment. Following an 11-year gap, Tremors 5: Bloodlines was released in 2015, with the franchise's sixth inclusion, Tremors: A Cold Day in Hell, in 2018. These two films were made by Universal 1440 Entertainment without any involvement from Stampede Entertainment. All Tremors sequels thus far have been released direct-to-video without a theatrical release, though Tremors 2: Aftershocks did receive a brief limited theatrical run. Another direct-to-video sequel, Tremors: Shrieker Island, was released in October 2020.

In 2003, the franchise spawned a television show titled Tremors: The Series. The show aired in 2003 on the Syfy Channel but was canceled after one season. A 60-minute pilot for a second television series also titled Tremors was filmed in 2017, but no further episodes of this show were ever filmed.

In popular culture
 Amnesia: The Dark Descent'''s water monster enemy called the Kaernk (or Lurky among developer Frictional Games' employees) was slightly inspired by the creature in Tremors, as revealed in the developer commentary for the game, Tremors was Frictional Games employee Thomas Grip's favorite film when he was a child.
 On March 21, 2012, the NBC Nightly News story "Shaken and awakened in Wisconsin" jokingly blamed the filming of a "Tremors remake" as the cause for unidentified loud booming noises.
"Bad Apple!", a 2013 episode of the superhero comedy series The Aquabats! Super Show!, features a scene of a giant underground worm attacking a desert farm which series co-creator Christian Jacobs noted was an homage to Tremors, with some shots mirroring those in the original film.
 "Sandy, SpongeBob, and the Worm", an episode of the second season of the animated television series SpongeBob SquarePants, features a large worm known as the "Alaskan bull worm"; the worm is defeated when it tumbles off a cliff, similar to the death of the final graboid in Tremors.
 Tremors is one of several monster films referenced in James Gunn's 2006 horror-comedy Slither, as the high school depicted in the movie is named the "Earl Bassett Community School", a nod to Fred Ward's character from the first two Tremors'' entries.

See also
Survival film

References

External links

 
 
 
 
 
 Tremors on WorldwideBoxoffice

1990 action thriller films
1990s comedy horror films
1990 directorial debut films
1990 comedy films
1990 films
1990 horror films
1990s monster movies
1990s science fiction films
American comedy horror films
American science fiction comedy films
American monster movies
American science fiction horror films
Films directed by Ron Underwood
Films set in deserts
Films set in Nevada
Films shot in California
Films adapted into television shows
Films produced by Gale Anne Hurd
Giant monster films
Tremors (franchise)
Universal Pictures films
1990s English-language films
1990s American films
Films about worms